The 1998 Clásica de Almería was the 13th edition of the Clásica de Almería cycle race and was held on 1 March 1998. The race started in Puebla de Vícar and finished in Vera. The race was won by Mario Traversoni.

General classification

References

1998
1998 in road cycling
1998 in Spanish sport